Comatose is the fifth single from Christian rock band Skillet's sixth studio album of the same name. The song won Rock Song Of The Year in 2008.

Track listing 
 "Comatose" - 3:50

Credits 
 John Cooper - lead vocals, bass
 Korey Cooper - rhythm guitar, keyboards, backing vocals
 Lori Peters - drums
 Ben Kasica - lead guitar

Certifications

References 

Skillet (band) songs
2006 songs
2006 singles
Songs written by Brian Howes
Songs written by John Cooper (musician)
Lava Records singles
Atlantic Records singles
Ardent Records singles